Pirituba is a train station on CPTM Line 7-Ruby, located in the district of Pirituba in São Paulo.

History
The station was opened by São Paulo Railway (SPR) on 1 February 1885. After the federal government absorbed the SPR lines, a new station was built and opened in 1964.

After being operated by many federal companies (EFSJ, RFFSA, EBTU and CBTU), the station was transferred to the São Paulo State Government in 1994, through the mixed economy society CPTM.

References

Companhia Paulista de Trens Metropolitanos stations
Railway stations opened in 1885